Andrew Knott (born 22 November 1979) is a British actor. He is known for portraying Dickon Sowerby in 1993 film adaptation, The Secret Garden, based on  the novel by Frances Hodgson Burnett,  and as Henry Green in the television drama series, Where the Heart Is. He has also appeared in the sitcom, Gavin & Stacey as Dirtbox.

Life and career
Knott was born in Salford. His first acting was done in British television and radio programmes. He was trained in the Oldham Theatre Workshop. Knott's first major film was Warner Brothers' The Secret Garden in 1993, in which he played Dickon Sowerby. He went on to play Joe Green in Black Beauty. In the late 1990s, he played Darren Featherstone and Liam Shepherd in Coronation Street.

In 2004, he returned to theatre to act in Alan Bennett's The History Boys. The National Theatre production later toured the world, affording Knott his Broadway debut. He reprised his role on BBC radio, and in Bennett's film adaptation which was directed by the National's Nicholas Hytner. In 2011, he appeared in "The National Anthem", an episode of the anthology series Black Mirror.
Knott most recently appeared in the TV series Drop Dead Gorgeous, Gavin & Stacey and the BBC 3 drama series Spooks: Code 9 as Rob. Recently he appeared in 1 episode of the LGBT miniseries Banana and he has guest starred on the BBC show Father Brown.

Knott is married with two daughters.

Credits

Awards and nominations

References

External links 
 

English male child actors
English male film actors
English male radio actors
English male stage actors
English male television actors
1979 births
Living people
Male actors from Salford
20th-century English male actors
21st-century English male actors